Wahlburgers is an American reality television series that aired from January 22, 2014 to July 31, 2019 on A&E. During its 10 seasons, Wahlburgers aired 95 episodes.

Premise

The series is based on the casual dining burger restaurant and bar Wahlburgers, a chain of restaurants that started in the Greater Boston town of Hingham, Massachusetts., and the lives of the Wahlberg family. The Wahlburgers business is owned by chef Paul Wahlberg in partnership with two of his brothers, actors and singers Donnie and Mark.

Main cast
Mark Wahlberg, actor, producer, rapper
Donnie Wahlberg, actor, producer, a member of New Kids on the Block
Paul Wahlberg, chef, actor
Alma Wahlberg , mother of Donnie, Mark, and Paul, actress; she died on April 18, 2021
Brandon Wahlberg, nephew of Donnie, Mark, and Paul
Bob Wahlberg, brother of Mark, Donnie and Paul
Henry "Nacho" Laun, a childhood friend of the brothers
Johnny "Drama" Alves, a childhood friend of the brothers and an aspiring actor, miscellaneous crew, and special effects
Kari Burke, Paul's assistant and operations manager
Billy Leonard, a childhood friend of Mark and an investor in the restaurant
Jenny McCarthy, Donnie's wife and actress, producer, and writer
Rhea Durham, Mark's wife and model and actress

Episode overview

Reception
Allison Keene of The Hollywood Reporter said that "only a true and abiding love for the Wahlbergs will keep viewers interested." Brian Lowry of Variety said the show is "generally playful, but it is just empty calories". Mark A. Perigard of The Boston Herald gave the show a B−.

In 2014 and 2015, Wahlburgers received Emmy nominations for Outstanding Unstructured Reality Program.

Spin-off
Donnie Loves Jenny is a reality television series based on the newlywed Donnie Wahlberg and Jenny McCarthy's relationship and premiered on January 7, 2015.

Syndication
AXS TV acquired syndicated rights to the series, which began airing on February 27, 2022.

Further reading

References

External links
 – television show

2010s American reality television series
2014 American television series debuts
2019 American television series endings
A&E (TV network) original programming
Food reality television series
Television shows set in Boston
Television series about families
Wahlberg family